Bebington railway station serves the town of Bebington in Merseyside, England. The station is situated on the Chester and Ellesmere Port branches of the Wirral Line, forming part of the Merseyrail network.

History 
The station is on the former Chester and Birkenhead Railway, opening in 1840 as Bebington before being renamed 'Bebington and New Ferry' on 1 May 1895.

The name was changed back to just Bebington on 6 May 1974.

Direct train services to Liverpool began in 1985, when the line between Rock Ferry and Hooton was electrified; previously passengers for Liverpool had to change at Rock Ferry. Further electrification in the early-1990s allowed electric train services to be extended, first to Chester in 1993 and then Ellesmere Port in 1994.

In June 2014 it was announced that the station would be among a small number across the Merseyrail network that would be renovated as part of a £3.7m programme of improvements, namely refurbishment and improvement of passenger areas, lighting and CCTV coverage. Between February and March 2015, the subway leading to Platform 1 was refurbished. An electronic information board was also added at the street entrance.

Facilities
The station is staffed during all opening hours and has platform CCTV. There is a payphone, a vending machine and a booking office. There are live departure and arrival screens on the platform, for passenger information. Each of the two platforms has sheltered seating. The station has a free car park, with 24 spaces and also a cycle locker with 25 spaces. Access to the station and both platforms is by ramp, allowing easy access for passengers with wheelchairs or prams.

Services
Trains operate every 15 minutes between Chester and Liverpool on weekdays and Saturdays, until late evening when the service becomes half-hourly, as it is on Sundays. Additionally there is a half-hourly service between Liverpool and Ellesmere Port all day, every day. Northbound trains operate via Hamilton Square station in Birkenhead and the Mersey Railway Tunnel to Liverpool. Southbound trains all proceed as far as Hooton, where the lines to Chester and Ellesmere Port divide. These services are all provided by Merseyrail's fleet of Class 507 and Class 508 EMUs.

Gallery

References

Further reading

External links 

Railway stations in the Metropolitan Borough of Wirral
DfT Category E stations
Former Birkenhead Railway stations
Railway stations in Great Britain opened in 1840
Railway stations served by Merseyrail